Cyrtodactylus chaunghanakwaensis,  also known as the  Chaunghanakwa Hill bent-toed gecko, is a species of gecko endemic to Myanmar.

References

Cyrtodactylus
Reptiles described in 2018
Endemic fauna of Myanmar
Reptiles of Myanmar